Alagang Kapatid (translated in Filipino as A Sibling's Touch, A Sibling's Caress, or A Sibling's Care) is TV5's first ever medical show. The show is hosted by Cheryl Cosim, formerly the host of Salamat Dok on ABS-CBN. The show first aired from September 11, 2010, to August 5, 2012, and then returned to the air on November 8, 2015. The show concluded on October 10, 2020.

History
Alagang Kapatid first aired on TV5 on September 11, 2010. The program helps every kapatid, through mounting medical missions, and offers assistance to the less fortunate and during emergency cases. Cheryl Cosim welcomes her team of public servants whose aim is to provide information in maintaining their health, and enough inspiration for them to move towards a better healthier lifestyle. The show ended on August 5, 2012.

After a three-year hiatus, it returned on the air on November 8, 2015, every Sunday at 2:00 p.m. It also changed their format from a health show to a public service program featuring the projects and plans of the Alagang Kapatid Foundation, the socio-civic arm of TV5. After 10 years and 1 month, the show ended on October 10, 2020, due to TV5's programming revamp under the leadership of TV5/Cignal President and CEO Robert Galang.

Segments

Health
Dr. Walter Laurel is a cum laude graduate of BS Psychology at the UP College of Social Sciences and Philosophy, and earned his degree in medicine at the UP College of Medicine. Doctor Walter has been exposed to medical missions and outreach projects through institutions he was previously connected to, like the Regional Office of the Western Pacific area of World Health Organization, and Philippine General Hospital.

Dr. Ali Bilas is a UERM College of Medicine graduate and a life coach whose public service experience includes immersions in urban poor communities, and as project head for outreach programs thru UP PGH and UP Manila ROTC. Together, they handled the segment ImbestigaDok which investigates health issues.

Fitness
In the segment Let's Get Physical, fitness gurus offer exercise routines, and introduce exercise and fitness regimens. Coach Gelli Victor is a certified group exercise instructor for Body Jam at Fitness First and was chosen as an Adidas endorser for her active lifestyle and being an advocate of fitness. She has done print advertisements for health products and posed for fitness magazines, has promoted fitness through her radio show at RX 93.1 from 2004 to 2010, and guested as resource person on TV shows. Coach Noelle De Guzman's journey to fitness began with her own struggles being overweight.

Food and nutrition
The resident chefs reach out to every home, across all economic classes, thru the segment Kitchen Raid and teach them how to produce healthy dishes from their kitchens. Joining the quest is Chef Jeremy Favia, who has done cooking shows. He took up culinary arts at the International School for Culinary Arts and Hotel Management, and had weight issues, until he discovered the art of healthy eating. With him is Chef Francis Tolentino, a chef host at TV5's morning show, Sapul sa Singko. He learned his culinary expertise in ISCHA, and Magsaysay Center for Hospitality and Culinary Arts under the program of Johnson and Wales University.

Alagang Kapatid sa Radyo5

 Alagang Kapatid sa Radyo5 airs every Saturday at 1:00 pm, right after Kamay ni Hesus Healing Mass on 92.3 Radyo5 True FM and One PH. The program is anchored by Menchie Silvestre and Mon Gualvez.

See also
News5
List of programs aired by TV5 (Philippine TV channel)
92.3 Radyo5 True FM

References

External links
 TV5 website

Philippine medical television series
2010 Philippine television series debuts
2020 Philippine television series endings
2015 radio programme debuts
TV5 (Philippine TV network) original programming
One PH original programming
News5 shows
Filipino-language television shows